Document Journal is an independent culture, arts, and fashion magazine founded in New York in 2012. Published biannually in the spring and fall, the magazine is printed in book format and distributed globally.

Document focuses on American and global culture, and features prominent voices of art, literature, and fashion. Document'''s editor-in-chief and creative director is Nick Vogelson. The fashion/ creative director is Sarah Richardson.

Notable Contributors

 Inez & Vinoodh
 Mert and Marcus
 Juergen Teller
 Joe McKenna
 Bruce Weber
 Mario Sorrenti
 Grace Coddington
 Hedi Slimane
 Richard Prince
 Collier Schorr
 Craig McDean
 Larry Clark
 Hans-Ulrich Obrist
 Rei Kawakubo
 Hilton Als
 Klaus Biesenbach
 Tyler Mitchell

 External links 
 Document Journal Celebrates 5 Years With an Intimate Dinner of Fashion Legends Vogue.com. Talking Social Responsibility at Document Journal’s Fifth Anniversary Party WWD. Five Years, Ten Issues—Talking Document Journal's Milestones with Nick Vogelson Fashion Unfiltered. Document Journal Celebrates Its 5th Anniversary with a Packed House Fashion Week Daily. How Hedi Slimane Presaged Fashion's Instagram Obsession Business of Fashion. McQ and Document Come Together for Fashion Week Performance Art Fashion Unfiltered. Never-Ending Grace: At 75, Grace Coddington Can't Be Stopped Yahoo Style. In Fashion, There’s Magic in Longtime Collaborations Cathy Horyn, The Cut. Miuccia Prada on Communism and Why She’s Against Beauty The Cut.''

Cultural magazines published in the United States
Magazines established in 2012
Biannual magazines published in the United States
Magazines published in New York City
2012 establishments in New York City